Mjoberg (and variants) may refer to:

 Eric Mjöberg (1882–1938), Swedish zoologist and ethnographer
 Nina Mjøberg (born 1964), Norwegian politician

See also
 Mjoberg's toadlet, species of frog endemic to Australia
 Mjöberg's dwarf litter frog, species of frog endemic to Borneo